Lianyungang Huaguoshan International Airport is an airport in Guanyun County, Lianyungang, Jiangsu Province, China. The airport opened on 2 December 2021. It is Lianyungang's main airport, with the existing dual-use Lianyungang Baitabu Airport becoming a dedicated military air base.

It is named after Mount Huaguo (Huaguoshan), a major tourist attraction in Lianyungang.

It is projected to handle 2.5 million passengers and 20,000 tons of cargo after completion.

Airlines and destinations

References

Airports in Jiangsu
Airports established in 2021
Buildings and structures in Lianyungang
2021 establishments in China